Robert LeFevre (October 13, 1911 – May 13, 1986) was an American libertarian businessman, radio personality, and primary theorist of autarchism.

Early life

LeFevre was born in Gooding, Idaho, on October 13, 1911, but when he was a child LeFevre's family moved to Minneapolis, Minnesota. LeFevre attended Hamline University studying English and drama. He then worked at a variety of jobs during the Great Depression, such as acting and radio announcing. For a short time, LeFevre was a Shakespearean actor.

LeFevre was a follower of the "I AM" movement from 1936 to 1940 or so. He and one Pearl Diehl wrote a book in 1940 of their experiences in the organization called "I AM" – America's Destiny (Twin City House, St. Paul, Minnesota). LeFevre told how one day, when he was in the radio station studio, he was struck by the Great I AM presence, who spoke to him personally. LeFevre also claimed a number of supernatural experiences: driving a car while asleep for over twenty miles without an accident (this was accomplished with the help of his "Higher Mental Body"), leaving his physical body for a trip through the air to Mount Shasta, and seeing Jesus.

In 1940, I AM leaders Edna Ballard and her son Donald were indicted by a grand jury in Los Angeles for use of the mails to defraud. Twenty-four other I AM leaders were also named in the first indictment; a supplemental indictment named LeFevre and Diehl as being defendants.  During World War II, LeFevre served as an officer in the education and orientation division of the Army Air Corps before being discharged  in 1945 after spending a year in Europe and being injured in an accident. Soon after, he and his wife went on a cross-country lecture tour "in a pilgrimage for world peace." Their tour was bankrolled by the Falcon Lair Foundation, a nonprofit group interested in religion, philosophy and government whose headquarters were Falcon Lair, Beverly Hills, California (the former home of actor Rudolph Valentino).

After the war, LeFevre went to California and worked in the real estate business and unsuccessfully ran for Congress in the Republican primary of 1950. He then became radio and television broadcaster becoming involved in anti-leftist causes, including work for an anti-union organization named the Wage Earners Committee. A year later the committee was sued by two movie producers, Stanley Kramer and Dore Schary, for picketing and libeling their films as being pro-Soviet. LeFevre and Ruth Dazey were among the defendants, but the case died when the Wage Earners Committee disintegrated.

A few years later he  became vice-president of Merwin K. Hart's National Economic Council; a director of the Congress of Freedom; a director of the U.S. (sometimes United States) Day Committee—whose purpose it was to diminish in importance the observation of October 23 as United Nations Day—and an adviser to Harry Everingham's "We, The People!".  The U.S. Day Committee made headlines in 1954 when LeFevre led an attack on the Girl Scout Handbook as having too many references to the United Nations. The Scouts retreated, reporting that more than forty changes had been made—about half of which were due to LeFevre's protests.

That same year LeFevre relocated to Colorado Springs and started to write editorials for R. C. Hoiles' Gazette-Telegraph. Two years later he founded the Freedom School. What animated LeFevre personally and the Freedom School ideologically—indeed, forms the bedrock upon which all courses were based—is a complicated philosophy that, in essence, rejects all government of modern times.

Freedom School
In 1956, LeFevre founded the Freedom School, which he ran until 1973, in Larkspur, Colorado. In 1965, after a flood devastated the campus, the school and college moved to Santa Ana, California. The Freedom School was designed to educate people in LeFevre's philosophy about the meaning of freedom and free-market economic policy. LeFevre added Rampart College, an unaccredited four-year school, in 1963. Both institutions shared the same campus, and had a press, The Pine Tree Press, which published works for both, including a newsletter for the Freedom School, the Rampart Journal of Individualist Thought (1965–68), and a tabloid for the Press itself.

After Rampart College's closure in 1975, LeFevre carried on his work in South Carolina under the patronage of business giant Roger Milliken, and he also published Lefevre's Journal from 1974 to 1978. In 1979, LeFevre selected Freedom School graduate Kevin Cullinane to take over the teaching of Freedom School Seminars, including the Milliken Contract. Cullinane, who taught the principles of LeFevre's philosophy to students at Academy of the Rockies, which he had founded in 1972, taught Freedom School from 1979 until 2005 as part of Milliken's management training. He expanded its reach to include Sherman College, Wofford College, and individual seminars from coast to coast. Cullinane then left Freedom School behind in 2000, establishing his own school, Freedom Mountain Academy, in Tennessee, which ran until 2017, when it was shut down.

Notable teachers at the Freedom School or Rampart College include Rose Wilder Lane, Milton Friedman, F.A. Harper, Frank Chodorov, Leonard Read, Gordon Tullock, G. Warren Nutter, Bruno Leoni, James J. Martin, and Ludwig von Mises.

Notable graduates include Roy Childs, Kerry Thornley, and Roger MacBride.

Rampart Institute
In the late 1970s, LeFevre became involved with the Rampart Institute in Santa Ana, California. Along with Lawrence Samuels and Richard Deyo, LeFevre was one of the driving forces to found the institution, presenting two speeches that were turned into booklets: "Good Government: Hope or Illusion?" and "Does Government Protection Protect?" Not long after receiving its non-profit, tax-deductible status, Rampart Institute was officially launched at The Future of Freedom Conference banquet on April 19, 1980 at Cypress College.  From that event came the "Liberty Book Project," which sought to edit and publish LeFevre's 52-week audio home study-course called "The Fundamentals of Liberty". The hardback book was published posthumously in 1988, two years after LeFevre's death.

Views

LeFevre believed that natural law is above the law of the state and that for American society to prosper economically, free-market reforms were essential. He also believed that bestowing the good deeds of society on its government was no different from rewarding criminals for abstaining from illegal activity.

To this end, he adopted the term Autarchism to represent the idea of ruling over your own life, being responsible for yourself, your needs, and the consequences of your choices and actions. In a speech in 1977 and published the next year in the book Good Government: Hope or Illusion?, he said:

Pacifism
LeFevre was also famously a pacifist, and taught his brand of libertarianism during the 1960s at the Freedom School, later Rampart College. Given his dedication to pacifism, LeFevre also spoke out against war as a product of the state. He once gave a speech called "Prelude to Hell" to a local Lions Club about what it would be like for a typical American city to get nuked as a result of "those mighty, terrible, pointless conflicts that the modern state inevitably creates." According to Doherty, LeFevre was "capable of facing down angry lieutenant colonels, who raged at his pacifistic refusal to fight for the flag, and explaining his theory of human rights so patiently, so guilelessly, that in the end the crusty colonel had to admit that LeFevre was right to stand his ground."
According to Robert Smith, LeFevre became convinced of the power of non-violent resistance after a run-in with a union. "I remember him telling the story," says Smith, "of union goons busting into a radio station he worked at. And he just fell flat on the ground and lay there. They were so nonplussed they walked out without beating the shit out of him. That convinced him of the principles of nonviolence."

In popular culture
 Some such as Brian Doherty claim that LeFevre's movement was a basis for Robert A. Heinlein's book The Moon Is a Harsh Mistress and that LeFevre was the basis for the character Professor Bernardo de la Paz, organizer of the Lunar revolution.
 In the alternate history novel The Probability Broach by L. Neil Smith as part of the North American Confederacy Series in which the United States becomes a libertarian state in 1794 after a successful Whiskey Rebellion and the overthrowing and execution of George Washington by firing squad for treason, LeFevre served as the 23rd President of the North American Confederacy from 1960 to 1968.

Bibliography
 Anarchy (1959)
 The Nature of Man and His Government (Caxton Printing, 1959) 
 This Bread is Mine (American Liberty Press, 1960)
 Constitutional Government in the Soviet Union (Exposition Press, 1962; Pine Tree Press, 1966)
 Limited Government – Hope or Illusion? (Pine Tree Press, 1963)
 Role of Private Property in a Free Society (Pine Tree Press, 1963)
 Anarchy v. Autoarchy (Pine Tree Press, 1965)
 Money (Pine Tree Press, 1965)
 The Philosophy of Ownership (Pine Tree Press, 1966, 1985; Ludwig von Mises Institute, 2007)
 Justice (Rampart College, 1972)
 Lift Her Up Tenderly (Pine Tree Press, 1976)
 Does Government Protection Protect? (Society for Libertarian Life ed, Rampart Press, 1978)
 Good Government: Hope or Illusion?(Society for Libertarian Life ed, Rampart Press, 1978)
 The Libertarian (Bramble Minibooks, 1978?)
 Protection (Rampart College, n.d.)
 The Fundamentals of Liberty (Rampart Institute, 1988) (posthumously) 
 A Way to Be Free (Pulpless, 1999) (posthumously) (autobiography) Vol 1 , Vol 2

Notes

Further reading

External links

 LeFevre's essay, "Who Was the Original Aunt Jemima and What Did She Do?"
 LeFevre's essay, "Autarchy"
 LeFevre's essay, "The Nature of Man and His Government" (1959)
 Audio archive of 50 LeFevre commentaries hosted by the Ludwig von Mises Institute. These commentaries have made their mark in the history of libertarian ideas for their clarity, eloquence, and pedagogical value. Drawing on great thought from all ages, and specifically influenced by Rothbardian political economy, Robert LeFevre asks and answers fundamental questions about the relationship between man, property, society, and the state.
 Guide to the Robert LeFevre papers from 1946–1981 at the University of Oregon.
 Robert LeFevre's FBI file hosted at the Internet Archive

1911 births
1986 deaths
United States Army Air Forces personnel of World War II
American anarcho-capitalists
American libertarians
American pacifists
American political writers
American male non-fiction writers
American radio personalities
Libertarian theorists
Voluntaryists
United States Army Air Forces officers
People from Gooding, Idaho
Businesspeople from Minneapolis
Activists from California
California Republicans
20th-century American businesspeople
20th-century American male writers